Colegio Preciosa Sangre is a Chilean primary and secondary school located in Purranque, Los Lagos Region, Chile.



References 

Secondary schools in Chile
Educational institutions established in 1940
1940 establishments in Chile